Deng Zhong (Chinese: 邓忠; Pinyin: Dèng Zhōng) is a character in Fengshen Yanyi. He is the number one figure of the four Mount Yellow Blossom's lords. During the personal Western Foothills campaign of the Grand Old Master Wen Zhong, these four would become an assisting sword of the Shang Dynasty.

Plot
In appearance, Deng Zhong has an indigo face, protrusive buck teeth, and long crimson red hair; he also wields a great golden axe as his primary weapon. During his first encounter with Wen Zhong, he was killed through a golden prison genjutsu trick employed by Wen Zhong. Due to second brother Xin Huan's later compliance, Deng would serve as a loyal sword of Wen Zhong following his revival. Once Wen had finally arrived at the foot of the Western Foothills, Deng would personally deliver a letter to Jiang Ziya. Once battle had begun following three days of time, Deng would personally battle it out against Huang Feihu with his golden axe.

Deng was appointed as one of the 24 Leibu Tianju (雷部天君) in the end.

Notes

Chinese gods
Investiture of the Gods characters